Canal de Caen à la Mer (also called the "Caen Canal") is a short canal in the department (préfecture) of Calvados, France, connecting the Port of Caen, in the city of Caen, downstream to the town of Ouistreham and the English Channel.

It was deepened in 1920. The canal began with the dock at St. Peter's Basin (Bassin Saint-Pierre), in the downtown area of Caen. The canal is made up of a group of quays and docks.

It acts as the fourth commercial French port for the importation of exotic wood, generally coming from the Gulf of Guinea. It also loads and unloads iron, fertilizer, coal, and construction material. The port exports cereals that are produced in the area and has a silo capacity of 33,000 tons.

One of the two locks at the port of Ouistreham, at the mouth of the canal, can accommodate ships of more than  length.

Also at Blainville is a Renault Trucks manufacturing plant. The plant is across the canal from the town, to the southeast, between the canal and the Orne River. Just across the river from the plant is the community of Colombelles.

The channel passes the side of the Château de Bénouville. The famous Pegasus Bridge (aka "Ham"), from D-Day, June 6, 1944, crossed the canal near the village of Bénouville. The canal was considered both tactically and strategically important during the opening phases of the Battle of Normandy, as it was located on the eastern flank of the Allied beachhead area. The bridge was replaced in 1994.

Canal route
(From mouth to terminus)
 Ouistreham
 Bénouville
 Blainville-sur-Orne
 Colombelles
 Hérouville-Saint-Clair
 Caen

See also
 List of canals in France
 Operation Tonga

References

External link

Canals in France
Buildings and structures in Caen
Buildings and structures in Calvados (department)
Transport in Normandy
Canals opened in 1857
1857 establishments in France